The Indspire Awards, until 2012 the National Aboriginal Achievement Awards, are annual awards presented by Indspire in Canada.  The awards are intended to celebrate and encourage excellence in the Aboriginal community.

About
The awards were first established in 1993, and presented in 1994, in conjunction with the United Nations declared International Decade of the World's Indigenous People.  The awards are intended to celebrate and encourage excellence in the Indigenous community. Awards may be presented in a variety of categories, depending on the particular achievements of Aboriginal people in the nominating period—14 awards are presented each year including one for Lifetime Achievement and three special Youth Awards, one each for First Nations, Inuit and Métis, that comes with a cash prize of $10,000 and 10 career categories with not all individual career categories necessarily presented annually. To be eligible an individual must be of either First Nations, Inuit, or Métis heritage.  Additionally they must demonstrate outstanding career achievement, and be a permanent Canadian resident or be Canadian born. The awards are broadcast annually on the Global Television Network and the Aboriginal Peoples Television Network (APTN). Since 1985 Indspire through its Education Program has awarded more than $87 million in scholarships and bursaries to more than 25,00 First Nations, Inuit and Métis students nationwide.

Award categories
The award categories are:

Arts
Business and Commerce
Culture, Heritage and Spirituality
Education
Environment and Natural Resources
Health
Law and Justice
Politics
Public Service
Sports
Lifetime Achievement Award
Youth Award, First Nation
Youth Award, Inuit
Youth Award, Métis

Eligibility criteria
Individuals of First Nations, Inuit, and Métis ancestry who have reached a significant level of achievement in their respective occupations are eligible for nomination. Any person may nominate a candidate they deem to be worthy of this recognition with reference to the following criteria:

 Of First Nations, Inuit or Métis heritage
 Who demonstrate outstanding career achievement
 Of any age with the exception of the youth category
 Permanent Canadian resident or Canadian born
 Youth achiever nominees must be 15–27 years of age

Indspire Awards recipients
Each year 14 recipients are recognized for their outstanding accomplishments in various disciplines ranging from health, law, political science, culture, arts, and others, two of which are specific recognition to one outstanding youth achiever and one lifetime achievement recipient. The awards are recognized both nationally and internationally as one of the highest honours the community can bestow upon its own achievers.

1994

William Lyall, Business
Jean Cuthand Goodwill, Community Service
Verna Kirkness, Education
Cindy Kenny-Gilday, Environment
Alanis Obomsawin, Film
Murray Sinclair, Justice
Bill Reid, Lifetime Achievement
Susan Aglukark, Performance
Thelma Chalifoux, Public Service
Nellie Cournoyea, Public Service
Rosemarie Kuptana, Public Service
Art Solomon, Spiritual Leadership
Ted Nolan, Sports

1995

Douglas Cardinal, Architecture
Robert Davidson, Arts and Culture
Frank Hansen, Business and Culture
Louis Stevenson, Community Development
Ernest Benedict, Education
Marie Smallface Marule, Education
Ahab Spence, Education
Matthew Coon Come, Environment and Public Service
Maggie Hodgson, Health Services
Alfred Scow, Law and Justice
Kenojuak Ashevak, Lifetime Achievement
Noah Carpenter, Medicine
Sharla Tiakohatéhkwen Howard, Special Youth
Angela Chalmers, Sports

1996

Maria Campbell, Arts
Tom Jackson, Arts
Rose Auger, Culture, Heritage & Spirituality
James Watson Walkus, Culture, Heritage & Spirituality
Marlene Brant Castellano, Education
Mary Simon, Environment and Natural Resources
Frank Arthur Calder, Lifetime Achievement
Yvon Dumont, Public Service
Phil Fontaine, Public Service
Elijah Harper, Public Service
Albert Charles Rock, Science and Technology
Robert E. Johnson Jr., Special Youth
Alwyn Morris, Sports
Mary Two-Axe Earley, Women's Rights

1997

Kiawak Ashoona, Arts
Gil Cardinal, Arts
Graham Greene, Arts
Rita Joe, Arts
Billy Diamond, Business & Commerce
Charlie Watt, Community Development
Stanley John McKay, Culture, Heritage & Spirituality
Martin Gale McLoughlin, Health
Chester R. Cunningham, Law & Justice
Harry S. LaForme, Law & Justice
Olive Dickason, Lifetime Achievement
Stephen Kakfwi, Public Service
George Berthe, Special Youth
Darren Zack, Sports

1998

Tantoo Cardinal, Arts
Daphne Odjig, Arts
Tagak Curley, Business & Commerce
Abel Bosum, Community Development
Emily Jane Faries, Education
Cornelia Wieman, Health
Joe Crowshoe, Heritage and Spirituality
Roberta Jamieson, Law & Justice
Buffy Sainte-Marie, Lifetime Achievement
John Amagoalik, Public Service
Georges Erasmus, Public Service
Dan E. Goodleaf, Public Service
Wade R. Cachagee, Special Youth
Bryan Trottier, Sports

1999

Dorothy Grant, Business & Commerce
David Gabriel Tuccaro, Business & Commerce
Dorothy Betz, Community Development
Theresa Stevenson, Community Development
Mitiarjuk Nappaaluk, Culture, Heritage & Spirituality
Howard Adams, Education
Malcolm King, Health
Edward Kantonkote Cree, Health
James Igloliorte, Law & Justice
Rose Toodick Boyko, Law & Justice
Allen Sapp, Lifetime Achievement
James Bartleman, Public Service
Lillian Dyck, Science
‘Alika LaFontaine, Youth

2000

Art Thompson, Arts
John Charles Bernard, Business & Commerce
Roy Albert Whitney, Business & Commerce
Paul J. Birckel, Community Development
Simon Baker, Culture, Heritage & Spirituality
Edith Josie, Culture, Heritage & Spirituality
Jo-Ann Archibald, Education
Miles G. Richardson, Environment and Natural Resources
Fjola Hart-Wasekeesikaw, Health
Steven Point, Law & Justice
Joseph Arthur Gosnell, Lifetime Achievement
Leetia Ineak, Media & Communication
Konrad Haskan Sioui, Public Service
Waneek Horn-Miller, Special Youth

2001

Tomson Highway, Arts
Dolly Watts, Business & Commerce
Fred House, Community Development
Mariano Aupilardjuk, Culture, Heritage & Spirituality
Freda Ahenakew, Education
Mary Thomas, Environment and Natural Resources
Lindsay Crowshoe, Health
Harold Cardinal, Lifetime Achievement
Roman Bittman, Media & Communication
Zacharias Kunuk, Media & Communication
Leonard Marchand, Public Service
Richard Nerysoo, Public Service
Nick Sibbeston, Public Service
Lance Relland, Special Youth

2002

Ohito Ashoona, Arts
Freda Diesing, Arts
Harry Deneron, Business & Commerce
Leonard (Len) G. Flett, Business & Commerce
George Kurszewski, Community Development
Noel Knockwood, Culture, Heritage & Spirituality
Roy Fox, Energy
Gilles Pinette, Health
Alex Janvier, Lifetime Achievement
Gail Guthrie Valaskakis, Media & Communication
Jonah Kelly, Media & Communication
Joseph Tokwiro Norton, Public Service
Jordin Tootoo, Special Youth
Michael Nepinak, Sports

2003

John Arcand, Arts
Tom King, Arts
Mel E. Benson, Business & Commerce
Gary Bosgoed, Business & Commerce
Mary Richard, Community Development
Charles Edward Lennie, Culture, Heritage & Spirituality
Leroy Little Bear, Education
Simon Lucas, Environment and Natural Resources
Judith Bartlett, Health
Jay Wortman, Health
John J. Borrows, Law & Justice
Robbie Robertson, Lifetime Achievement
Sophie Pierre, Public Service
Matthew Dunn, Special Youth

2004

Tina Keeper, Arts
Susan Point, Arts
Osuitok Ipeelee, Arts
Clarence Louie, Business & Commerce
Basil Johnston, Culture, Heritage & Spirituality
Carl Urion, Education
Sheila Watt-Cloutier, Environment and Natural Resources
Stanley Vollant, Health
Muriel Stanley Venne, Law & Justice
Andrew T. Delisle Sr., Lifetime Achievement
Suzanne Rochon-Burnett, Media & Communication
Pearl Calahasen, Public Service
Lee Wilson, Science and Technology
Kristinn Frederickson, Special Youth

2005

Joe Jacobs, Arts
Gerald McMaster, Arts
Douglas Golosky, Business & Commerce
Judy Gingell, Community Development
John Joe Sark, Culture, Heritage & Spirituality
Eber Hampton, Education
Emma LaRocque, Education
Andy Carpenter Sr., Environment and Natural Resources
Thomas Dignan, Health
Bertha Allen, Lifetime Achievement
Brenda Chambers, Media & Communication
Lolly Annahatak, Social Services
Fauna Kingdon, Special Youth
Sharon Anne Firth, Sports

2006

Jane Ash Poitras, Arts
Bernd Christmas, Business & Commerce
Wendy Grant-John, Community Development
Gladys Taylor Cook, Culture, Heritage & Spirituality
Taiaiake (Gerald) Alfred, Education
Billy Day, Environment and Natural Resources
Herb Belcourt, Housing
James (Sakej) Youngblood Henderson, Law & Justice
Jim Sinclair, Lifetime Achievement
Myra Cree, Media & Communication
George Tuccaro, Media & Communication
Tony Belcourt, Public Service
Andrea Dykstra, Special Youth
Shirley Firth Larsson, Sports

2007

Joane Cardinal-Schubert, Arts
Jack Poole, Business & Commerce
Alestine Andre, Culture, Heritage & Spirituality
Joe Michel, Education
David Walkem, Environment and Natural Resources
Joseph Couture, Health
Hugh Braker, Law & Justice
Bertha Clark Jones, Lifetime Achievement
Lisa Meeches, Media & Communication
Fred Carmichael, Politics
Lewis Cardinal, Public Service
James Makokis, Special Youth
Wegadesk Gorup-Paul, Sports
Monica Peters, Technology & Trades

2008

Shirley Cheechoo, Arts
Jim Boucher, Business & Commerce
Hubert Skye, Culture, Heritage & Spirituality
Marie Ann Battiste, Education
Elizabeth (Tshaukuesh) Penashue, Environment and Natural Resources
Jeff Reading, Health
David C. Nahwegahbow, Law & Justice
Norval Morrisseau, Lifetime Achievement
Paul Andrew, Media & Communication
Joe Handley, Politics
Sylvia B. Maracle, Public Service
Boyd Wesley Benjamin, Special Youth
Reggie Leach, Sports

2009

Melanie Jackson, Arts
Dennis Jackson, Arts
Allan C. McLeod, Business & Commerce
Stephen J. Augustine, Culture, Heritage & Spirituality
Cecil King, Education
Gordon W. Prest, Environment and Natural Resources
Candace Grier-Lowe, Health
Delia Opekokew, Law & Justice
Stan Cuthand, Lifetime Achievement
Carol Morin, Media & Communication
Paul Okalik, Politics
Joan Glode, Public Service
Chelsea Lavallée, Special Youth
Adam Sioui, Sports
Mervin J. Dewasha, Technology & Trades

2010

Kananginak Pootoogook, Arts
Ellen Melcosky, Business & Commerce
Tom Crane Bear, Culture, Heritage & Spirituality
Raoul J. McKay, Education
Danny Beaton, Environment and Natural Resources
Madeleine Kētēskwew Dion Stout, Health
Donald Worme, Law & Justice
William Commanda, Lifetime
Kenneth Atsenhaienton Deer, Media & Communication
Eric Robinson, Politics
Edith Cloutier, Public Service
Skawenniio Barnes, Special Youth
Monica Pinette, Sports
Doug Henry, Technology & Trades

2011

Corrine Hunt, Arts
Joseph F. Dion, Business & Commerce
Paingut Annie Peterloosie, Culture, Heritage & Spirituality
Margo L. Greenwood, Education
Ronald Edward Sparrow, Environment & Natural Resources
Marcia Anderson DeCoteau, Health
Roger Jones, Law & Justice
Lillian McGregor, Lifetime
Jean LaRose, Media & Communications
Audrey Poitras, Politics
Cindy Blackstock, Public Service
Teyotsihstokwáthe Dakota Brant, Special Youth
Frederick G. Sasakamoose, Sports
Duncan Cree, Technology & Trades

2012

Adam Beach, Arts
Victor S. Buffalo, Business & Commerce
Dave Courchene, Culture, Heritage & Spirituality
Leona Makokis, Education
Richard Stewart Hardy, Environment & Natural Resources
Janet Smylie, Health
Violet Ford, Law & Justice
Gerry St. Germain, Lifetime
Richard Wagamese, Media & Communications
Leona Aglukkaq, Politics
Edward John, Politics
Minnie Grey, Public Service
Richard Peter, Sports
Earl Cook, Youth
Candace Sutherland, Youth

2013

Jacqueline Guest, Arts
Charlie Evalik, Business & Commerce
Winston Wuttunee Culture, Heritage & Spirituality
Shawn A-in-chut Atleo, Education
Lloyd (Sonny) Flett, Environment & Natural Resources
Ruby Jacobs, Health
Viola Robinson, Law & Justice
Alex Van Bibber, Lifetime Achievement
Duane Smith, Politics
Gail Cyr, Public Service
Theoren Fleury, Sports
Gabrielle Scrimshaw, Youth First Nation
Elizabeth Zarpa, Youth Inuit
Graham Kotowich, Youth Métis

2014

Kent Monkman, Arts
Marie Yvonne Delorme, Business & Commerce
Maggie Paul, Culture, Heritage & Spirituality
Rita Bouvier, Education
Charlie Snowshoe, Environment & Natural Resources
Evan Tlesla II Adams, Health
Marion Meadmore, Law & Justice
James Eetoolook, Lifetime Achievement
Stewart Philip, Politics
Robert Watts, Public Service
Mary Spencer, Sports
John Nicholas Jeddore, Youth First Nation
Sarah Arngna’naaq, Youth Inuit
Christie Lavallée, Youth Métis
Kristinn Frederickson, Youth Special

2015

Ron E. Scott, Arts
Brenda La Rose, Business and Commerce
Peter Irniq, Culture, Heritage & Spirituality
Paulette C. Tremblay, Education
Gerald Anderson, Environment and Natural Resources
William Julius Mussell, Health
Wilton Littlechild, Law and Justice
Elsie Yanik, Lifetime Achievement
Kim Baird, Politics
Madeleine Redfern, Public Service
Gino Odjick, Sports
Jordan Konek, Youth
Kendal Netmaker, Youth
Gabrielle Fayant, Youth Métis

2016

Joseph Boyden, Arts
Clint Davis, Business and Commerce
Jim Ochiese, Culture, Heritage, & Spirituality
Mae Louise Campbell, Culture, Heritage, & Spirituality
Jo-Ann Episkenew, Education
Pat Mandy, Health
Mark L’Hirondelle Stevenson, Law and Justice
Robert Joseph, Lifetime Achievement
Mike Kanentakeron Mitchell, Politics
Leonard George, Public Service
Carey Price, Sports
Christian Kowalchuk, Youth Recipient
Killulark (Laura) Arngna’naaq, Youth Recipient
Zondra Roy, Youth Recipient

2017

Cece Hodgson-McCauley, Politics
Doreen Spence, Culture, Heritage & Spirituality
Duncan McCue, Public Service
Heather Kashman, Sports
Jan Kahehti:io Longboat, Culture, Heritage & Spirituality 
Josh Butcher, Youth
Kimberly R. Murray BA, LL.B, IPC, Law & Justice
Maatalii Okalik, Youth
Nathan Matthew, Education
Phillip “Jerry” Asp, Business & Commerce
Senator Murray Sinclair, Lifetime Achievement
Tekatsi:tsia’kwa Katsi Cook, Health
Thomas Dymond, Youth

2018

Ashley Callingbull, Youth - First Nation Recipient
Dr. Donna May Kimmaliardjuk, Youth - Inuit Recipient
Dr. Evelyn Voyageur, Health
Dr. Gloria Cranmer Webster, Lifetime Achievement
Dr. Lorna Wanosts’a7 Williams, Education
Dr. Mike DeGagné, Public Service
Greg Hill, Arts
Kye7e Cecilia Dick DeRose, Culture, Heritage & Spirituality
Michael Linklater, Sports
Nicole Bourque-Bouchier, Business & Commerce
Paul Chartrand, Law & Justice
Theland Kicknosway, Culture, Heritage & Spirituality
Tracie Léost, Youth - Métis Recipient

2019

Atuat Akittirq, Lifetime Achievement
Barbara Todd Hager, Arts
Billy-Ray Belcourt, Youth - First Nation Recipient
Brigette Lacquette, Sports
Dianne Corbiere, Law & Justice
Dr. Marlyn Cook, Health
Dr. Vianne Timmons, Education
Grand Chief Ronald Derrickson, Business & Commerce
James Lavallée, Youth - Métis Recipient
Jijuu Mary Snowshoe, Culture, Heritage & Spirituality
Kelly Fraser, Youth - Inuit Recipient
Peter Dinsdale, Public Service

2020

Alicia Aragutak, Youth - Inuit Recipient
Ta'Kaiya Blaney, Youth - First Nation Recipient
Claudette Commanda, Culture, Heritage & Spirituality
Jeannette Corbiere Lavell, Lifetime Achievement
Marian Jacko, Law & Justice
Karen Lawford, Health
Candice Lys, Education
Dawn Madahbee Leach, Business & Commerce
Alana Robert, Youth - Métis Recipient
Cowboy Smithx, Arts
Gina Wilson, Public Service

2021

Lesley Hampton, Youth
Mitchell MacDougall, Youth
Justin Langan, Youth
Drew Hayden Taylor, Arts
Rosa Walker, Business and Commerce
Emily Angulalik, Culture, Heritage, and Spirituality
Lorne Gladu, Education
Catherine Cook, Health
Val Napoleo, Law and Justice
Nahanni Fontaine, Public Service
Dallas Soonias, Sports
Qapik Attagutsiak, Lifetime Achievement

2022

Shayla Oulette-Stonechild, Youth
Melissa Attagutsiak, Youth
Tristen Durocher, Youth
David Wolfman, Arts
Jenn Harper, Business & Commerce
Siyamiyateliot Elizabeth Phillips, Culture, Heritage & Spirituality
Annette Trimbee, Education
Melanie MacKinnon, Health
Cheryl Arcand-Kootenay, Law & Justice
Terry Goodtrack, Public Service
Terry Felix, Sport
Marjorie White, Lifetime Achievement

See also
 Aboriginal Canadian personalities

References

External links
 Indspire
Indspire Laureates with biographies of each recipient